Jane White (October 30, 1922 – July 24, 2011) was an American actress best known for her Broadway and off-Broadway stage performances. She won Obie Awards in 1966 for her performance in a Shakespeare in the Park productions of Loves Labours Lost and Coriolanus and in 1971 for sustained achievement.

In 1945, she made her Broadway debut in Strange Fruit. This performance was followed by roles in Razzle Dazzle, The Insect Comedy, The Climate of Eden, Take a Giant Step, Jane Eyre, and The Power and The Glory. In 1959, she opened the acclaimed musical Once Upon a Mattress, originating the role of Queen Aggravain alongside Carol Burnett and Joseph Bova.

Early life and education
White was born in New York City to Gladys Leah Powell and Walter Francis White, a civil-rights leader and national secretary of the NAACP. She grew up in the fashionable Sugar Hill neighborhood of Harlem at 409 Edgecombe Avenue. The house was nicknamed "The White House of Harlem" because of the prominent and important figures who were part of her parents' circle, such as James Weldon Johnson, Paul and Eslanda Robeson, Carl Van Vechten, and George Gershwin. She had one brother, Walter Carl Darrow White.

White attended Smith College beginning in the early 1940s; she majored in sociology so she might follow her father into social activism, but she maintained a stronger passion for the arts. She minored in music, studying classical voice with Anna Hamlin, and participated in extracurricular dance and fencing. In 1943 she also served as president of the student house of representatives, making her the first black student elected to serve in a government position at Smith.

At the beginning of her freshman year, a fellow resident in White's dormitory, who was white, told the college leadership that she refused to share a dormitory with a woman of color and would leave the school unless White were forced to leave. The college rejected the ultimatum; the student elected to stay.

Career

Early career
White worked for a short time as a proofreader for the Research Institute of America while also attending beginners' acting classes at New York's New School.

In 1945, White secured her first part playing the lead role of "Nonnie" in the Broadway production of Strange Fruit. The play was an adaptation of the controversial novel about interracial love in the South. She was originally recommended for the part by Paul Robeson, a friend of the White family. The play opened to mixed reviews, but both White and the play received positive attention from Eleanor Roosevelt, then First Lady, who wrote her own review in her column My Day. Of White's performance, Roosevelt wrote: I should like to pay tribute to the cast of this play as a whole, but particularly to Jane White whose first venture this is on the stage and who plays her part with restraint and beauty.

In 1959, White played the role of the scheming Queen Aggravain in Once Upon a Mattress, in which Carol Burnett made her Broadway debut.

In 1965, White and her husband, restaurateur Alfredo Viazzi, left New York for Italy, returning three years later.

1970s–2011
White continued to work steadily in theatre and occasionally in television and movies from the 1970s through the 2000s. Her theatrical work has spanned summer stock, off-Broadway and on-Broadway shows. Much of her work was in classical dramas, with particular focus on Shakespeare; she won an Obie Award for her roles in the 1965–66 New York Shakespeare Festival as Volumnia in Coriolanus and the Princess of France in Love's Labour's Lost.

In the late 1970s, White and her husband opened Alfredo’s Settebello in the Village, and White performed there as a cabaret singer.

She won the 1988–89 Los Angeles Critics Circle Award for her role as the Mother in Federico Garcia Lorca's Blood Wedding. She has additionally played roles in such dramas as Euripides' Iphigenia at Aulis and Henrik Ibsen's Ghosts; comedies such as Paul Rudnick's I Hate Hamlet; and musicals such as Stephen Sondheim's A Little Night Music and the 2001 production of Sondheim's Follies, to name a small selection.

In addition to the productions of Once Upon a Mattress, her television work included a 1979 stint on the soap operas The Edge of Night, A World Apart, and Search for Tomorrow.  She was one of the first African-American actresses to play a role under contract on soap operas when she originated the role of Lyndia Holliday, R.N., on The Edge of Night. In 1998, she played the schoolteacher Lady Jones in the movie version of Toni Morrison's Beloved. From 1979-80, White starred in a self-written, one-woman cabaret show entitled Jane White, Who?, which interspersed autobiographical anecdotes and personal reminiscence with songs. As late as 2006, she continued to perform occasionally in cabaret theater.

Personal life
In 1962, White met the New York restaurateur Alfredo Viazzi, and after a short courtship they were wed. They moved to Italy in 1965, but moved back to the U.S. in the late 1960s. Viazzi died of a heart attack on December 28, 1987, aged 66.

White donated her papers to the Sophia Smith Collection at Smith College in 1989 and continued to send additions until her death in 2011.

Death
White died on July 24, 2011, in New York City, aged 88.

Work

Film

Stage

Television

Awards 
White won the 1965–66 Obie award for her performances in the New York Shakespeare Festival as the Princess of France in Love's Labor's Lost and Volumnia in Coriolanus, and the 1988-89 Los Angeles Critics Circle Award for the Mother in Lorca's Blood Wedding.

References

External links

Jane White papers at the Sophia Smith Collection, Smith College Special Collections

1922 births
2011 deaths

Actresses from New York City
Obie Award recipients
Harrison family of Virginia
Smith College alumni
The New School alumni
American television actresses
African-American actresses
American film actresses
African-American women singers
American musical theatre actresses
American expatriates in Italy